The following is a list of notable events and releases of the year 1987 in Norwegian music.

Events

April
 10 – The 14th Vossajazz started in Voss, Norway (April 10 – 12).

May

 20 – The 15th Nattjazz started in Bergen, Norway (May 20 – June 3).

August
 30 – The 18th Kalvøyafestivalen started at Kalvøya near by Oslo.

Albums released

Unknown date

B
 Ketil Bjørnstad
 Pianology (Hete Blikk)

G
 Jan Garbarek
 Making Music (ECM Records), with Zakir Hussain, Hariprasad Chaurasia, and John McLaughlin
 All Those Born With Wings (ECM Records)

R
 Terje Rypdal & The Chasers
 Blue (ECM Records)

Deaths

 January
 25 – Øivind Bergh, violinist and orchestral leader (born 1909).

 February
 26 – Torbjørn Knutsen, composer and violinist (born 1904).

 March 
 18 – Kari Diesen, actor and singer (born 1914).

 May
 13 – Signe Amundsen, classical violinist and orchestral leader (born 1899).

 November
 13 – Aage Samuelsen, evangelist, singer and composer (born 1915).

 December
 2 – Trygve Henrik Hoff, singer, composer, songwriter, and writer (born 1938).
 16 – Eva Prytz, operatic soprano (born 1917).

Births

 January
 25 – Ann-Iren Hansen, folk singer and songwriter.

 February
 15 – Trygve Waldemar Fiske, jazz upright bassist.
 18 – Pål Moddi Knutsen, folk singer and songwriter.

 March
 13 – Harald Lassen, jazz saxophonist and pianist.

 April
 18 – Sandra Lyng, pop and dance singer.
 25 – Ida Jenshus, country singer.
 26 – Kim-Erik Pedersen, jazz saxophonist.

 May
 7 – Heida Mobeck,  jazz tubist and bass guitarist.
 20 – Ingrid Helene Håvik, songwriter and vocalist.
 24 – Mikhael Paskalev, singer, songwriter and guitarist.

 June
 11 – Didrik Solli-Tangen, singer.
 30 – Aleksander Denstad With, pop singer.

 August
 13 – Bendik Brænne, rock saxophone player and singer/songwriter.
 18 – Tine Thing Helseth, trumpet soloist.

 September
 11 – Bjørn Marius Hegge, jazz upright bassist and composer, Hegge.

 October
 12 – Bjørnar Kaldefoss Tveite, jazz upright bassist (Morning Has Occurred).
 25 – André Drage, drummer.

 November
 13 – Hanna Paulsberg, jazz tenor saxophonist and composer.
 29 – Cashmere Cat, DJ, record producer, musician and turntablist.

 December
 12 – Marte Eberson, jazz pianist, keyboardist and composer.

 Unknown date
 Anja Lauvdal,  jazz pianist, keyboardist, and composer.
 Hanne Kalleberg, jazz singer and composer.
 Thea Hjelmeland, Indie pop and folk singer and songwriter.

See also
 1987 in Norway
 Music of Norway
 Norway in the Eurovision Song Contest 1987

References

 
Norwegian music
Norwegian
Music
1980s in Norwegian music